W.A.K.O. World Championships 1979 were the second ever world kickboxing championships hosted by W.A.K.O., organized by American Mike Anderson.  They were open to amateur men only from across the world, with two styles of kickboxing - Full-Contact and Semi-Contact - on offer.  This was the championships where the (now) world famous martial artist turned actor Jean-Claude Van Damme was supposed to have competed – although reports on the event and from participating fighters give no confirmation of Van Damme ever participating.  By the end of the championships West Germany was the strongest nation, Italy were second, Great Britain third.  The event was held at the Hillsborough Community College in Tampa, Florida, USA between November 3 and 4 in 1979.

Men's Full-Contact Kickboxing

The Full-Contact category at Tampa had seven weight divisions, ranging from 57 kg/125.4 lbs to over 84 kg/+184.8 lbs, with all bouts fought under Full-Contact rules.  More detail on Full-Contact's rules-set can be found at the W.A.K.O. website, although be aware that the rules have changed since 1979.  The medal winners of each division are shown below with notable winners being Tony Palmore who won his second gold medal at a W.A.K.O. world championships and reigning W.A.K.O. European champion and future K-1 world champion Branko Cikatić picking up a bronze medal.  By the end of the event, West Germany were the strongest nation in Full-Contact, winning two golds and two silvers.

Men's Full-Contact Kickboxing Medals Table

Men's Semi-Contact Kickboxing

Semi-Contact returned to the 1979 world championships, having been absent from the 1978 world championships.  Semi-Contact differed from Full-Contact in that fights were won by using skill, speed and technique to score points rather than by excessive force - more detail on Semi-Contact rules can be found at the official W.A.K.O. website, although be aware that the rules will have changed since 1979.  Like Full-Contact there were seven weight divisions ranging from 57 kg/125.4 lbs to over 84 kg/+184.8 lbs.  The medal winners of each division are shown below with West Germany being the top nation in Semi-Contact by the championships end.

Men's Semi-Contact Kickboxing Medals Table

Overall Medals Standing (Top 5)

See also
 List of WAKO Amateur World Championships
 List of WAKO Amateur European Championships

References

External links
 WAKO World Association of Kickboxing Organizations Official Site

1979 in American sports
1979 in sports in Florida
1979 in kickboxing
20th century in Tampa, Florida
Kickboxing in the United States
Sports competitions in Tampa, Florida
WAKO Amateur World Championships events
International sports competitions in Florida